The 2002 Scotland rugby union tour of North America was a series of matches played in June 2002 in North America by Scotland national rugby union team.

Results
'Scores and results list Scotland's points tally first.

First test
			
Canada:15. Winston Stanley, 14. Fred Asselin, 13. Nik Witkowski, 12.John Cannon, 11. Sean Fauth, 10. Jared Barker, 9. Morgan Williams, 8. Phil Murphy, 7. Dan Baugh, 6. Ryan Banks, 5. Mike James, 4. Alan Charron , 3. Jon Thiel, 2. Pat Dunkley, 1. Rod Snow – Replacements: 19. Colin Yukes18. Ed Knaggs22. Kyle Nichols17. Kevin Wirachowski – Unused: Harry Toews, Ed Fairhurst, Bobby Ross			
Scotland:15. Glenn Metcalfe, 14. Rory Kerr, 13. Andy Craig, 12. Brendan Laney, 11. Chris Paterson, 10. Duncan Hodge, 9. Mike Blair, 8. Jon Petrie, 7. Simon Taylor, 6. Jason White, 5. Stuart Grimes (cap), 4. Nathan Hines, 3. Craig Smith, 2. Gordon Bulloch, 1. Mattie Stewart – Replacements: 16. Steve Brotherstone, 17. Allan Jacobsen, 18. Graeme Burns, 19. Donnie Macfadyen, 20. Andy Hall, 21. Ben Hinshelwood, 22. Marcus Di Rollo

Second test

United States:15.John Buchholz, 14. Mose Timoteo, 13. Phillip Eloff, 12. Link Wilfley, 11. Jason Keyter, 10. Mike Hercus, 9. Kevin Dalzell, 8. Dave Hodges (cap), 7. Kort Schubert, 6. Aaron Satchwell, 5. Luke Gross, 4. Eric Reed , 3. Dan Dorsey, 2. Kirk Khasigian, 1. Mike MacDonald – Replacements: 16.Dan Anderson, 17. Andy McGarry 18. John Tarpoff 19. Conrad Hodgson20. Kimball Kjar22. Jone Naqica – Unused: Riaan Hamilton
Scotland:15. Glenn Metcalfe, 14. Rory Kerr, 13. Andy Craig, 12. Brendan Laney, 11. Chris Paterson, 10. Duncan Hodge, 9. Mike Blair, 8. Simon Taylor, 7. Donnie Macfadyen, 6. Jason White, 5. Stuart Grimes (cap), 4. Nathan Hines, 3. Mattie Stewart, 2. Gordon Bulloch, 1. Allan Jacobsen – Replacements: 16. Steve Scott, 17. Craig Smith, 18. Andy Hall, 20. Graeme Burns, 21. Andrew Henderson, 22. Marcus Di Rollo – Unused: Ally Hogg

Scotland
tour
Scotland national rugby union team tours
tour
rugby tour
Rugby union tours of Canada
Rugby union tours of the United States
June 2002 sports events in North America